Ashinaga eophthalma is a moth of the family Oecophoridae. It is found in China.

References

Moths described in 1931
Oecophorinae